Deion may refer to:
Deion Barnes (born 1993), American football player
Deion Branch (born 1979), American football player
Deion Jones (born 1994), American football player
Deion Sanders (born 1967), American former football and baseball player
Deioneus, several figures in Greek mythology

See also
 Deon, given name
 d'Eon, a surname
 Dion (disambiguation), includes a list of people with given name Dion
 Dione (disambiguation), includes a list of people with given name Dione
 Dionne (name), given name and surname

Masculine given names